Frederick Vern was a German who was one of the leaders in the Eureka Rebellion. He helped form the Ballarat Reform League. Vern went into hiding after the rebellion and spent a number of months on the run.

References

Australian rebels
Australian activists